The Benworth-Chapman Apartments and Chapman Cottages are two apartment buildings in Salt Lake City, Utah. The Benworth-Chapman Apartments building was built as Benworth Apartments by George Bowles & Sons in 1927, and designed in the Mission Revival style. Bowles sold the building to Benjamin L. Farnsworth in 1927, and Farnsworth, his wife Alice and some of their children lived in the building with their tenants. The building belonged to the Zions Bank from 1933 to 1937, when it was acquired by  Clarissa G. Chapman, who renamed it Chapman Apartments. Chapman Cottages was built in 1937–1940. It has been listed on the National Register of Historic Places since December 30, 2004.

References

National Register of Historic Places in Salt Lake City
Mission Revival architecture in Utah
Residential buildings completed in 1927
1927 establishments in Utah